Shannon and Shannade Clermont (born March 21, 1994), known as the Clermont twins, are American models, fashion designers, and television personalities. They received media attention from their appearances on the fourteenth season of the reality television series Bad Girls Club in 2015, and have since developed an extensive online and social media presence.

Lives and careers

Early lives and education 
The identical twins were born in Montclair, New Jersey on March 21, 1994. They are the youngest of five siblings, with one sister and two brothers. Their parents are both immigrants. Their mother is from Jamaica and operated a daycare, and their father is from Haiti and owned a moving company. They have described their family as "hard-working, working class," and moved to Dallas, Georgia when they were nine years old. They began modeling when they were 14 years old. After winning a six-month program at an acting and modeling school, they worked as stand-ins for television shows including Tyler Perry's House of Payne. 

The twins developed an interest in fashion from their aunt, a fashion designer in New York City. They stated that "[they] didn't have any other plan other than getting to New York City" despite both receiving full college scholarships in Georgia; Shannon attended the Fashion Institute of Technology for fashion merchandising and Shannade attended Parsons School of Design for strategic design, and both graduated with bachelor's degrees in 2016. They have since relocated to Los Angeles.

Reality television 
In 2015, the Clermont twins appeared as two of the seven original cast members on the fourteenth season of the reality television series Bad Girls Club. Shannon stated that they participated on the show because "[they] just wanted people to know who [they] are" on a national level. They were removed from the series following the seventh episode, in which an altercation occurred involving other cast members destroying their belongings. They stated that "[they] would never do [Bad Girls Club] again," but stated that "[they] definitely grew from that show [and] learned a lot" and credited the show with "[allowing them] to get an audience that really grew with [them]." 

They have acknowledged the show for having significantly expanded their fanbase on social media, and have been labeled as influencers following their appearance. Highsnobiety writer Lia McGarrigle commented that the Clermont twins' appearances on Bad Girls Club "harnessed their [...] notoriety as a launchpad to build their personal brand", and was comparable to Cardi B's appearance on Love & Hip Hop: New York before the release of her signature song "Bodak Yellow".

Fashion and modeling 
The Clermont twins' public profile was significantly increased after being featured in Kanye West's "Yeezy Season 6" collection in January 2018, in which they appeared alongside models including Paris Hilton as "clones" of Kim Kardashian. They were unaware of Kardashian's and West's interest in their participation until the day before the campaign was shot in December 2017. The twins later modeled for Gypsy Sport during New York Fashion Week in 2018. They walked together for The Blonds in January 2019 and Shannon independently for Chromat in September 2019. They previously modeled for the fall 2015 Married to the Mob collection.

They launched their Mont Boudoir fashion label in 2017, which they designed to be "timeless" and has been reviewed as "equal parts Western cowboy and gothy '90s starlet." The brand relaunched with the "Money" sunglasses in June 2020. They acknowledged Mary-Kate and Ashley Olsen as being among their inspirations for the collection. Previously, the twins interned for fashion labels including Jovani and Yves Saint Laurent.

The twins have appeared in music videos including "Same Damn Time" and "Real Sisters" by Future, "Gin and Drugs" by Wiz Khalifa and "Good Form" by Nicki Minaj.

Personal lives 
The Clermont twins share two Yorkshire Terrier dogs named Chase and Chloe, which they rotate together between each of their apartments so the dogs are not separated. Speculation regarding the twins' changed appearances began following their appearances on Bad Girls Club. They have since acknowledged that they have undergone cosmetic surgery for "everything besides [their] boobs," including buttock, cheek, chin, and lip augmentations.

Shannade's legal charges 
Shannade Clermont was arrested and charged with aggravated identity theft, access device fraud, and conspiracy to commit wire fraud on July 11, 2018. Clermont was stated to have been solicited as a prostitute by Manhattan-based real estate broker James Alesi on January 31, 2017, and to have recorded his debit card information before his incidental death while under the influence of alcohol, cocaine, and fentanyl that evening after her departure. 

She was not suspected for involvement in his death. However, she was investigated after Alesi's account information was connected to purchases and money transfers made by Clermont after his death. She pleaded guilty in November, and was sentenced to one year in prison in April 2019. 

Clermont turned herself into FCI Dublin on June 4, 2019. She was released early on March 9, 2020. Her lawyer Jeffrey Lichtman stated that the twins began the Clermont Foundation for mental health after Shannade experienced suicidal thoughts from the legal proceedings.

References

External links 
 
 

Identical twin females
American people of Jamaican descent
American people of Haitian descent
1994 births
Living people
Participants in American reality television series
American people of Chinese descent
American twins
American people of Indian descent